Delhi is an unincorporated community in Crawford County, in the U.S. state of Missouri. The community was located west-southwest of Bourbon on the Little Bourbeuse River. The community of Argo was also on the river, approximately three miles to the north (downstream).

History
A post office called Delhi was established in 1883, and remained in operation until 1905. The community's name is a transfer from Delhi, India.

References

Unincorporated communities in Crawford County, Missouri
Unincorporated communities in Missouri